Aliens Ate My Homework is a 2018 American science fiction comedy film directed by Sean McNamara and based on Bruce Coville's novel of the same name. This film stars an ensemble cast, led by Jayden Greig, William Shatner, Dan Payne and Alex Zahara.

The film premiered on Netflix on March 6, 2018, in the United States. It was followed by a sequel, Aliens Stole My Body (2020).

Plot 
When a spaceship flies through his window and lands on his school work, Rod and his cousin Elspeth meet a group of extraterrestrial lawmen known as the Galactic Patrol. They must help their new alien friends foil the plans of interplanetary criminal BKR, who has been hiding on Earth as Billy Becker, a school bully with a passion for making Rod's life miserable.

Cast 
 Jayden Greig as Rod Allbright
 William Shatner as the voice of Phil the Plant
 Dan Payne as Grakker
 Tristan Risk as Madame Pong
 Alex Zahara as Tar Gibbons
 Lauren McNamara as Elspeth McMasters
 Ty Consiglio as Billy Becker
 Kirsten Robeck as Gwen Allbright
 Christian Convery as Eric Allbright
 Carmela Guizzo as Linda Allbright
 Christine Lee as Ms. Maloney
 Sean Quan as Mickey
 Sandy Robson as Art Allbright
 Brad Proctor as Phil the Plant puppeteer
 Jamie Swettenham as Plink puppeteer

Bruce Coville also plays J. Carter, the principal of Rod's school, "Coville Elementary." The role is non-speaking until a mid-credits scene, where he delightedly reads a copy of the original Aliens Ate My Homework novel in his office and narrates the fate of BKR, the story's villain.

Differences from the novel
The film closely follows the story of the original novel, albeit with two major changes. Notably, the film includes the character of Elspeth, who did not appear on-page until the novel's sequel, I Left My Sneakers in Dimension X. The crew of the Ferkel is also minus one member, as the alien known as Snout is not included in the film, despite playing a major role in the book series.

Release 
In March 2018, Universal Pictures Home Entertainment acquired distribution rights to the film, and set it for a March 6, 2018 release.

The film has an estimated domestic DVD sale value of $46,603.

References

External links 
 
 Aliens Ate My Homework on Instagram
 

Films directed by Sean McNamara
Films about extraterrestrial life